Scutigera aethiopica is a species of centipede in the family Scutigeridae. It is found in Ethiopia and Uganda.

References 

 Silvestri F. (1895) Esplorazione del Giuba e dei suoi affluenti compiuta dal Cap. V. Bottego durante gli anni 1892-93 sotto gli auspici della Società Geografica Italiana. Risultati zoologici XVII. Chilopoda e Diplopoda, Annali del Museo Civico di Storia Naturale di Genova. 35: 481-490
 Silvestri F. (1910) Collezioni zoologiche fatte nell'Uganda dal Dott. E. Bayon. V. Contribuzione alla conoscenza dei miriapodi dell'Uganda, Annali del Museo Civico di Storia Naturale di Genova. 4: 457-478
 Bisby F.A., Roskov Y.R., Orrell T.M., Nicolson D., Paglinawan L.E., Bailly N., Kirk P.M., Bourgoin T., Baillargeon G., Ouvrard D. (red.) (2011). ”Species 2000 & ITIS Catalogue of Life: 2011 Annual Checklist.”. Species 2000: Reading, UK. Läst 24 September 2012.
 ChiloBase: A World Catalogue of Centipedes (Chilopoda) for the web. Minelli A. (ed), 2006-10-10

External links 
 

Scutigeromorpha
Arthropods of Ethiopia
Arthropods of Uganda
Animals described in 1895